The ARIA Music Award for Best Children's Album is an award presented at the annual ARIA Music Awards, which recognises "the many achievements of Aussie artists across all music genres", since 1987. It is handed out by the Australian Recording Industry Association (ARIA), an organisation whose aim is "to advance the interests of the Australian record industry." The Wiggles hold the record for the most wins in this category (or any category).


Winners and nominees
In the following table, the winner is highlighted in a separate colour, and in boldface; the nominees are those that are not highlighted or in boldface.

Notes

References

External links

Children
Children's albums
Album awards